A router plane is a hand plane used in woodworking for smoothing out sunken panels, and more generally for all depressions below the general surface of the pattern.

It planes the bottoms of recesses to a uniform depth and can work into corners that otherwise can only be reached with a chisel.

Nowadays, it is largely supplanted by the electrical router and shaper, but retains limited application.

Further reading

References

Planes